Austria competed at the 1928 Summer Olympics in Amsterdam, Netherlands. 73 (67 men and 6 women) competitors took part in 39 events in 13 sports.

Medalists

Athletics

Four athletes (2 men and 2 women) competed for Austria in 1928. It was the nation's fifth appearance in the sport. It was the first time that women's athletics events appeared at the Olympics. Bartoletta reached the finals in the discus throw, finishing 6th overall. It was Austria's best place in an athletics event since 1900 (a 5th place finish in the men's steeplechase).

Men

Track & road events

Combined events – Decathlon

Women

Track & road events

Field events

Boxing

Austria sent boxers to the Olympics for the second time. One boxer competed in the welterweight class. As with all 3 of Austria's boxers in 1924, Fraberger lost his first bout and placed 17th.

Men

Cycling

Two cyclists, both men, represented Austria in 1928. It was the nation's 3rd appearance in the sport, and 1st since 1912.

Track

Time trial

Sprint

 Tandem

Diving

Two divers, one man and one woman, represented Austria in 1928. It was the nation's third appearance in the sport, and the first time that Austria sent a male diver. Bornett, who had finished 6th in the springboard event in 1924, finished 9th this time. Staudinger competed in both of the men's events, but placed 6th in his group in each and did not advance to the finals.

Equestrian

Three riders, all men, represented Austria in 1928. It was the nation's second appearance in the sport. Von Pongracz, who had placed 12th in the individual dressage in 1924, competed again; this time, he finished 13th. The Austrian team finished 6th in the team dressage competition (the first time that event was held).

 Dressage

Fencing

Six fencers, all men, represented Austria in 1928. It was the nation's 6th in the sport, in which Austria had competed at every Olympics except 1904.

Hockey

Austria competed in field hockey for the first time in 1928.

Summary

Men's tournament

Team roster

Group play

Rowing

Two rowers, both men, represented Austria in 1928. It was the nation's 2nd appearance in the sport, and 1st since 1912. Flessl and Losert advanced to the semifinals of the men's double sculls. They were beaten twice by the American boat, once in round 2 and again in the semifinals. The latter defeat resulted in a bronze medal for the Austrians. It was Austria's first medal in rowing.

Sailing

One sailor competed for Austria in 1928. It was the nation's debut in the sport. Johanny was unable to advance to the final series in the 12' Dinghy competition.

Men

Swimming

Three swimmers, one man and two women, represented Austria in 1928. It was the nation's 6th appearance in the sport, and first since 1912. Schäfer was the only Austrian swimmer to advance to the semifinals; none reached an event final.

Weightlifting

Ten men represented Austria in weightlifting in 1928. Austria was one of five nations to have the maximum 2 weightlifters in each weight class. It was the nation's 2nd appearance in the sport. The Austrians had the most success at the lighter end of the competition, with Andrysek winning the featherweight and Haas sharing gold in the lightweight (with Kurt Helbig of Germany). They were Austria's first Olympic gold medalists in weightlifting; the best results for the county in 1924 had been silver medals. Andrysek and Haas also set Olympic records in 2 of the 3 lifts as well as totals; Andrysek's total was a world record, and both men's snatch lifts matched the standing world record. Leppelt also contributed to the record books with an Olympic record (shared three ways) in the snatch.

Wrestling

Two men represented Austria in wrestling in 1928. It was the nation's 3rd appearance in the sport; all of the Austrian wrestlers to date, including 1928, had competed in the Greco-Roman events. Wiesberger had Austria's best-yet result in the sport, placing 4th in the Greco-Roman heavyweight.

Art competitions

References

External links
Official Olympic Reports
International Olympic Committee results database

Nations at the 1928 Summer Olympics
1928
1928 in Austrian sport